The 2020 Team Speedway Junior European Championship was the 13th Team Speedway Junior European Championship season. It was organised by the Fédération Internationale de Motocyclisme and was the 9th as an under 21 years of age event.

The final took place on 29 August 2020 in Łódź, Poland. The defending champions Poland ran out comfortable winners, finishing 6 points clear of Denmark, who won the race off for the silver when Mads Hansen beat Oļegs Mihailovs.

It was the first time that the final consisted of seven teams instead of four and included a European team.

Results

Final
  Łódź
 29 August 2020

Race off for 2nd and 3rd place - Hansen beat Mihailovs.

See also 
 2020 Team Speedway Junior World Championship
 2020 Individual Speedway Junior European Championship

References 

2020
European Team Junior